= Peter Meer =

Peter Meer from Rutgers University, Piscataway, NJ was named Fellow of the Institute of Electrical and Electronics Engineers (IEEE) in 2012 for contributions to mean-shift and robust techniques in computer vision.
